Navia crassicaulis is a species of bromeliad in the genus Navia. This species is endemic to Venezuela.

References

crassicaulis
Flora of Venezuela